NS Brendan Simbwaye (P11) is a patrol boat of the Namibian Navy. Constructed and launched in Brazil, it was commissioned into the Namibian Navy in 2009. Its design was based on the Brazilian Navy's s. The vessel is used for patrolling Namibia's exclusive economic zone.

Description
The vessel is powered by two MTU 16V 396 TB94 diesel engines rated at  driving two shafts.

The vessel is armed one Bofors L/70 40 mm cannon and two Oerlikon 20 mm cannon. Brendan Simbwaye is equipped with Decca 1290A surface search radar. The patrol boat has a complement of 29 including four officers.

Operational history
In 2003, Namibia and Brazil entered into an agreement whereby Brazil would construct a patrol boat for Namibia based on its Grajaú class. The vessel was built by INACE at Fortaleza and was laid down on 25 February 2005. Named for Brendan Simbwaye, the patrol boat was launched on 1 May 2008 and commissioned on 16 January 2009 at Fortaleza. The ship then set sail to Namibia on 31 March 2009 and arrived in Walvis Bay 22 days later. During its maiden voyage to Namibia it was accompanied by the Brazilian Navy corvette  and made stops at Ascension Island and Saint Helena. The ship is operationally utilised for general exclusive economic zone management. The boat participated in the Southern African Development Community maritime exercise code named Golfinho in 2009.

Citations

References
 

 

Grajaú-class patrol boats
Ships built in Brazil
Ships of the Namibian Navy
2008 ships